Rising Star is a tugboat operated by the United States Air Force to assist cargo vessels supplying Thule Air Base, in northern Greenland. The tugboat is only operated during the period of three months or less that the port is ice-free. For the remainder of the year the vessel is pulled up on the beach. Rising Star is the Air Force's only tugboat.

References

External links

1991 ships
Ships of the United States Air Force